David Rothman (August 9, 1935 – June 12, 2004) was an American statistician, public policy advisor, and the creator of a computerized college football ranking system.

Rothman was the founder and executive director of the Foundation for the Analysis of Competitions and Tournaments (FACT), an organization and computer ranking used to select college football national champions. 

The NCAA recognizes Rothman (FACT) as a "major selector" of college football national championships for the years 1968–2006. The Bowl Championship Series, for the 1999–2001 college football seasons, used FACT as one of the computer polls used to select participants for the BCS National Championship Game.

Education and career

Rothman graduated from the University of Wisconsin.

Rothman spent many years working as a private-sector aerospace statistician for companies like Lockheed Corporation, Agbabian Associates, and Rocketdyne. Through Rocketdyne, he was part of the enormous scientific technical talent pool utilized by NASA to achieve the Apollo program Moon landing.  Through Agbabian Associates, he was part of the scientific technical talent pool utilized by NASA to analyze the mechanical structure used in the space shuttle reloading facility called the Vehicle Assembly Building.

College football rankings

According to Rothman, he first began ranking college football teams in 1963 using a precursory computer ranking formula. In the spring of 1970 or 1971 he developed the current ranking method used for FACT.

Rothman and his college football computer ranking system were discussed in a February 1968 issue of Time magazine.

In 1991 Sports Illustrated covered the bottom 10 teams on his list. At the time, the 0–6 Dr. Martin Luther College Lancers were ranked last out of 677 college football teams.

Rothman appeared on television once, and presented once as a keynote speaker of a statistical conference in New York City.

Rothman would eventually conduct his college football rankings as the executive director of the Foundation for the Analysis of Competitions and Tournaments (FACT), an organization he founded.

Bowl Championship Series

David Rothman's ranking system was a computerized mathematical ranking system fully developed by himself. It was unbiased and gained notice and popularity from Bowl Championship Series (BCS) administrators, his peers and the public. His system has the advantage that it was readily available to anyone who asked to use it, and it was nonproprietary.

Rothman would have liked his system to have been widely used in tournaments in college sports such as basketball and football, where standings of teams were available and coaches and schools could reproduce rankings quickly. This system only used the margin of the score and the name of the team to arrive at a ranking. He believed that the BCS organization could rely on his system because it was adequate and sufficient, and convinced them to use his system as one of the computer ranking systems used in determining their championship game participants.

In 2002, when the revised BCS rules required all participating computer rankings to remove any weighting toward margin of victory, Rothman opted to drop out of the BCS, rather than make the necessary changes in his system. Rothman's system by design was indirectly incorporating margin of victory. Rothman believed that it was evident that the success and validity of his system, which performed on a predictive basis, arose because he used the margin of victory as a factor.

FACT National Champions

The Foundation for the Analysis of Competitions and Tournaments selected the following NCAA Division I college football national champions. The NCAA has designated FACT as one of its “major selectors” of national championship teams for the seasons of 1968 through 2006.

 Years in which FACT was incorporated into the Bowl Championship Series computer rankings.

References

External links
 FACT College Football Standings
 FACT Source Code

1935 births
2004 deaths
The Bronx High School of Science alumni
University of Wisconsin–Madison College of Letters and Science alumni
Harvard Kennedy School alumni
People from Hawthorne, California
American statisticians
Mathematicians from New York (state)
Mathematicians from California
College football championships
Scientists from the Bronx